The DSA PAK 40 AGL (Spelled: Daud Sons Armoury PAK 40 Automatic Grenade Launcher) is a Pakistani 40 mm belt-fed automatic grenade launcher developed by Daud Sons Armoury (DSA) to replace the aging Mk 19 grenade launcher.

Overview
The PAK 40 is a belt-fed, blowback-operated, crew-served, fully-automatic weapon. It fires 40 mm grenades at a cyclic rate of 250 to 275 Rounds per minute. The weapon has a blowback system, which enables it to fire automatically.
 
The PAK 40's effective range to a point target is about 1,500 meters (1,600 yd). For night operation, a Night-vision device can be added with range of up to 1500 meters.

Moreover, the AGL is a man portable crewed weapon that can fire from both a tripod and vehicle mount. It can fire a wide range of Grenade types which include High Explosive (HE), Target practice rounds (TP), High Explosive Dual Purpose (HEDP) and Armour Piercing (AP) rounds. On impact, the HE grenade can be lethal within a radius of 10 metres while the AP rounds can punch through 60mm of Rolled homogeneous armour at 500 meters which make it effective to use against Armoured personnel carriers.

Users 

Some units acquired for trial basis in 2018.

Used by Denel for testing purposes .

See also 
Mk 19 grenade launcher

References

External links 
 Daud Sons Armoury

Weapons of Pakistan
Automatic grenade launchers
40 mm artillery
Pakistani inventions